The 1984–85 season was Port Vale's 73rd season of football in the English Football League, and first (12th overall) back in the Fourth Division following their relegation from the Third Division. John Rudge's first full season in charge, the Vale finished in mid-table following a season of rebuilding the squad. Veteran striker Ally Brown was top-scorer with 21 goals, whilst midfield dynamo Robbie Earle hit 19 goals. Defender Alan Webb was elected Player of the Year, whilst a young Ray Walker also spent a short period on loan at the club. Vale progressed to the Third Round of the FA Cup, and the Second Rounds of the League Cup and Associate Members' Cup.

Overview

Fourth Division
The pre-season saw four new arrivals: veteran striker Ally Brown (Walsall); winger Peter Griffiths (Stoke City); and both forward Derek Monaghan and reliable defender Alan Webb (West Bromwich Albion). This came after John Rudge stated that "Vale's reputation has been built on grit and determination and I will be looking to bring in the player who is willing to die for the cause". Attempts to re-sign Brian Horton failed once again, whilst Martin Henderson had his contract cancelled after failing to report for pre-season training – he later signed with Spalding United. Just before the season began Gary Brazil was signed on loan from Sheffield United.

The season opened with a 1–0 defeat to Mansfield Town. Tommy Gore soon announced his retirement due to a neck injury. The Vale then went five games unbeaten, as the club announced a new five year shirt sponsorship deal with Trentham firm Eagle Delivery Service. Young winger Ray Walker also arrived on loan from Aston Villa. The fans chanted 'what a load of rubbish' on 1 October, as Vale lost 3–0 at home to struggling side Northampton Town. Rudge stated that 'In truth we were rubbish' and promptly cancelled the player's day off. Another five game unbeaten run followed, as Brown showed his 'class' and Walker impressed. On 5 November, Eamonn O'Keefe scored a 'brilliant' hat-trick past Southend United in a 4–1 win. Rudge then signed Stockport County's outside-right Oshor Williams for £7,000. Vale's form then suffered after Walker returned to Villa Park. To remedy this Rudge signed Southend United midfielder Billy Kellock, who made 'a stunning impact' in his debut, playing a key part in the 5–1 victory over Exeter City on New Year's Day. This was the first of a sixteen-game unbeaten run, in which the team equalled a club-record six straight away draws between 19 January and 29 March.

On 2 February, Robbie Earle scored a hat-trick past Hereford United. Striker partner Ally Brown claimed "He is my brains and I am his legs". John Rudge received the Manager of the Month award for February. The next month Barry Siddall joined Stoke City on a free transfer, after Chris Pearce had established himself as the Vale's #1. Wayne Cegielski also signed with Blackpool and Eamonn O'Keefe followed him to Bloomfield Road for a £10,000 fee. Five victories in the opening six games of April took Vale sliding down the league, as Brown was out with a knee injury. Vale rallied to go through the final five games unbeaten.

They finished in twelfth place with sixty points, winning and losing fourteen games. Between them Brown and Earle racked up a combined total of forty goals in all competitions. Yet it was Russell Bromage who was selected for the PFA Fourth Division team.

Finances
On the financial side, a loss was made of £7,793 due to a 20% drop in attendance figures. The wage bill stood at £389,341, whilst gate receipts took in £128,954 and the lottery raised £191,000. The club's shirt sponsors were EDS. Five players left on free transfers, most significant were the departures of: Terry Armstrong and Derek Monaghan (retired); Colin Tartt (Shepshed Charterhouse); and Ian Griffiths (Wigan Athletic). Billy Kellock also refused terms, and so joined Halifax Town, whilst John Ridley joined Stafford Rangers as a player-coach. Vale received £700 following a tribunal claim, becoming the first Football League club to take a non-league club to a tribunal.

Cup competitions
In the FA Cup, Vale beat Northern Premier League side Macclesfield Town 2–1 at Moss Rose. This game was overshadowed by a fence collapse that left thirteen injured and led to 21 arrests. Town Chairman Alan Brocklehurst blamed 'the hooligan element of the Vale support', however Vale Chairman Jim Lloyd laid the blame at the feet of the police. The next round saw Vale conquer Scunthorpe United with a 4–1 home victory. In the Third Round they travelled to West Ham United's Upton Park, where the First Division club beat the "Valiants" 4–1.

In the League Cup, Vale went past Bury on away goals, having scored one of their two goals at Gigg Lane. In the Second Round they lost 2–1 at home to Second Division Wolverhampton Wanderers, though they did earn a goalless draw at Molineux.

In the Associate Members' Cup, Vale eliminated Northampton Town in a 2–1 replay victory at Sixfields. The original match saw an attendance of just 1,386 at Vale Park. At the replay Ian Griffiths required a skin graft after getting his hand trapped in a toilet door. Vale were knocked out in the next round by Bristol City, losing 2–1 to the Third Division side at Ashton Gate.

League table

Results
Port Vale's score comes first

Football League Fourth Division

Results by matchday

Matches

FA Cup

League Cup

Associate Members' Cup

Player statistics

Appearances

Top scorers

Transfers

Transfers in

Transfers out

Loans in

Loans out

References
Specific

General

Port Vale F.C. seasons
Port Vale